Konink is a surname. Notable people with the surname include:

Luk De Konink (born 1952), Belgian television actor
Servaes de Konink (1653/1654– 1701), Baroque composer from the Netherlands